DB-4 may refer to:

 Ilyushin DB-4, a twin engined long-range bomber of the Great Patriotic War, built in the USSR
 Aston Martin DB4, a British touring sports car of the late 1950s